Frank Waterman Stearns (November 8, 1856, Boston – 1939) was an American businessman whose father, Richard H. Stearns had founded the R. H. Stearns department store and company in Boston. His mother was Louise M. Waterman.

After graduating from Amherst College in 1878, he joined his father's retail dry goods firm in Boston. He became a partner in that company in 1881 and was appointed chairman of its board of directors in 1919. 

Stearns was an early supporter and close friend of his fellow Amherst College alumnus, Calvin Coolidge, whose political career, culminating in the presidency following the death of president Warren G. Harding in 1923, he championed. 

In 1880 Stearns married Emily Williston Clark, daughter of Amherst College alumnus William S. Clark. Frank Stearns died in Boston in 1939.

References

External Links 
 Claude Moore Fuess (AC 1905) Material for a Biography of Frank Waterman Stearns (AC 1878) at the Amherst College Archives & Special Collections. , Amherst College archives
 Marquis, Albert Nelson, Who's Who in New England, Volume 2, 1915, Chicago: A.N. Marquis. Cf. "Biographies of Richard Hall Stearns (Jr.) and William Foster Stearns" p.1015

1856 births
1939 deaths
Massachusetts Republicans
19th-century American businesspeople
American businesspeople in retailing
Businesspeople from Boston

Amherst College alumni